Vladimir Sherwood (or Shervud) may refer to:

Vladimir Osipovich Sherwood (1832 - 1897), Russian architect
Vladimir Vladimirovich Sherwood (1867 - 1930), Russian architect, son of Vladimir Osipovich Sherwood